KGCX (93.1 FM, "Eagle 93") is a radio station licensed to serve Sidney, Montana. The station is owned by The Marks Group. It airs a classic rock music format.

The KGCX studios are at 213 2nd Ave SW in Sidney.

The station was assigned the KGCX call letters by the Federal Communications Commission on February 3, 2004.

References

External links
KGCI Facebook

GCX
Richland County, Montana
Classic rock radio stations in the United States
Radio stations established in 2004
2004 establishments in Montana